was a Japanese actor and kabuki performer.  In 1945, he became the senior living kabuki actor in Japan.

Biography
Kichiemon construed his career in terms of "lifelong study" (gei) of that which cannot be seen in an actor's performance.

Nakamura Kichiemon is a formal kabuki stage name. The actor first appeared using the name in 1897; and he continued to use this name until his death.

He was the maternal grandfather of Nakamura Kichiemon II.  In the conservative Kabuki world, stage names are passed from father to son in formal system which converts the kabuki stage name into a mark of accomplishment.  In choosing to be known by the same stage name as his grandfather, the living kabuki performer honors his family relationships and tradition.
 
In a long career, he acted in many kabuki plays, including the role of Matsuō-maru in the July 1951 production of Sugawara Denju Tenarai Kagami.

Selected works
In a statistical overview derived from writings by and about Nakamura Kichiemon I, OCLC/WorldCat encompasses roughly 10+ works in 20+ publications in 2 languages and 80+ library holdings.

 1946 — "Kabuki geki no susumu beki michi" ("The way kabuki drama must advance"). Tögeki, Tokyo Gekijö program. May 7, 1946
 1951 — .  OCLC 33707206
 1956 —  OCLC 033708328

Honors
 Japan Art Academy
 Order of Culture, 1951

Gallery

See also
 List of people on stamps of Japan
 Shūmei

Notes

References
 Leiter, Samuel L. (2006).  Historical Dictionary of Japanese Traditional Theatre. Lanham, Maryland: Scarecrow Press. ;   OCLC 238637010
 __. ( 2002).  A Kabuki Reader: History and Performance. ; ;  OCLC 182632867
 Scott, Adolphe Clarence. (1955). The Kabuki Theatre of Japan. London: Allen & Unwin.  OCLC 622644114

External links

Japan Art Academy (in Japanese)
 Find-A-Grave: Kichiemon Nakamura, Aoyama Cemetery, Tokyo
 Art Institute of Chicago:  "Portrait of Nakamura Kichiemon" (1947) by Junichiro Sekino, 1914–1988

1886 births
1954 deaths
Japanese male actors
Kabuki actors
People from Tokyo
Male actors from Tokyo